Maximiliano y Carlota is a Mexican telenovela produced by Televisa for Telesistema Mexicano in 1965.

Cast 
Guillermo Murray as Maximiliano de Habsburgo
María Rivas as Empress Carlota de Mexico
Alberto Zayas as Napoleón III
Anita Blanch
Enrique Lizalde as Tomás Mejía
Gina Romand
Marta Zamora
Antonio Passy

References

External links 

Mexican telenovelas
1965 telenovelas
Televisa telenovelas
Spanish-language telenovelas
1965 Mexican television series debuts
1965 Mexican television series endings